The 1935 Colorado A&M Aggies football team represented Colorado A&M (now known as Colorado State University) in the Rocky Mountain Conference (RMC) during the 1935 college football season. It was the team's first season competing as Colorado A&M, a change from the university's previous name of Colorado Agricultural College. In their 25th season under head coach Harry W. Hughes, the Aggies compiled a 3–4–1 record (2–4–1 against RMC opponents), finished ninth in the RMC, and were outscored by a total of 75 to 58.

Schedule

References

Colorado AandM
Colorado State Rams football seasons
Colorado AandM Aggies football